Dale Taylor (born 12 December 2003) is a Northern Irish professional footballer who plays as a forward for League One club Burton Albion, on loan from Nottingham Forest and the Northern Ireland national team.

Club career
Taylor is a former youth academy player of Linfield. He joined English club Nottingham Forest in July 2020. He signed his first professional contract with the club in December 2020. On 4 July 2022, Taylor signed a new three-year deal with Forest. On 20 January 2023, Taylor signed on loan with EFL League One side Burton Albion for the remainder of the season.

International career
Taylor is a Northern Irish youth international. In November 2021, he received his first call-up to senior team. He made his senior team debut on 12 November 2021 in a 1–0 World Cup qualifier win against Lithuania.

Career statistics

International

References

External links
 

2003 births
Living people
Association football forwards
Association footballers from Northern Ireland
Northern Ireland youth international footballers
Northern Ireland under-21 international footballers
Northern Ireland international footballers
Linfield F.C. players
Nottingham Forest F.C. players
Burton Albion F.C. players